Kadambar  is a village in Kasaragod district in the state of Kerala, India.

Demographics
As of 2011 census, Kadambar village had population of 1,912 where 915 are males and 947 are females. Average literacy of Kadambar is 85.7 % which consists of 91.7 % male literates and 80 % female literates.

Transportation
Local roads have access to National Highway No.66 which connects to Mangalore in the north and Calicut in the south.  The nearest railway station is Manjeshwar on Mangalore-Palakkad line. Nearest airport is Mangalore.

Languages
This locality is an essentially multi-lingual region. The people speak Malayalam, Kannada, Tulu, Beary bashe and Konkani. Migrant workers also speak Hindi and Tamil languages.

Administration
This village is part of Meenja Panchayath and Manjeswaram assembly constituency which is again part of Kasaragod (Lok Sabha constituency)

References

Manjeshwar area